J. M. Chapman, a 90-ton schooner, was purchased in 1863, by Asbury Harpending and other California members of the Knights of the Golden Circle in San Francisco to outfit as a Confederate privateer.

Harpending's plan to capture Pacific Mail Steamship Company ships along the Pacific coast carrying gold and silver shipments to Panama. He intended to then take what he seized to support the Confederacy. The plan attempt was detected and a boarding party made up of crew from the United States Navy sloop-of-war , revenue officers, and San Francisco Police Department officers seized the ship and its crew on the night of their intended departure.  

The ship was lost in December 1864 on a voyage between Shoalwater Bay in Queensland, Australia,  and San Francisco.

References

California in the American Civil War
Privateer ships
Maritime history of California
1863 ships
Maritime incidents in 1863
Maritime incidents in December 1864
Ships of the Confederate States Navy